Trylen is a small lake 17 km (10 mi) south of central Stockholm, Sweden. Shared by Huddinge Municipality and Haninge Municipality, it forms part of the Tyresån Lake System.

Catchment area 
With its catchment area characterized by morass and pine covered rock faces, Trylen is a popular spot for walking and bathing. Motorboats are not permitted on the lake. Fishing permits do not apply in the lake.

Environmental influence 
Nutrients only reaches the lake from the air, which makes water quality high.

Flora and fauna 
An inventory in 1998 documented common reed, water horsetail, Menyanthes, yellow water-lily, white water-lily, floating-leaf pondweed, and flatleaf bladderwort. Additionally, there are red algae and mosses such as Fontinalis dalecarlica.

Birds by the lake includes mallard and common goldeneye. Toads were reported in the lake in 2004, as were dragonflies such as brown hawkers and brilliant emerald. No reports are available concerning bats, fishes, and crayfish.

Notes

References 
 
 

Geography of Stockholm
Lakes of Stockholm County